Agnes Takea was a Japanese Roman Catholic martyr.  Takea was married to another Catholic layperson, Cosmas Takeya Sozaburō.  They were beheaded, with Charles Spinola and companions, during the "Great Martyrdom" at Nagasaki.  She was beatified in 1867.

See also 
Martyrs of Japan

References

1622 deaths
17th-century Christian saints
Japanese women by century
17th-century Japanese people